Jaakko Ilkka Kuusisto (17 January 1974 – 23 February 2022) was a Finnish violinist, composer, and conductor.

Education

Kuusisto studied at the Sibelius Academy in Helsinki, majoring in violin, as well as at Indiana University under Miriam Fried.

Career
As a violinist, Kuusisto has appeared in  30 recordings, of which at least 17 credited as a primary artist, performing works from composers such as Sibelius, Prokofiev, Kalevi Aho and Armas Järnefelt; as a conductor, he has recorded a dozen times. On some recordings he collaborated with his brother and fellow violinist Pekka Kuusisto.

After an early career as violinist, Kuusisto increasingly turned his attention to composing and conducting. He composed approximately 40 works in total, including several operas, film scores and stage music,  15 pieces of chamber music, and numerous other compositions, as well as various orchestrations and arrangements. Some of his operas were commissioned by the Finnish National Opera and Savonlinna Opera Festival.

Before these, he served as the concertmaster of the Lahti Symphony Orchestra for many years, where he was personally invited by the orchestra's chief conductor Osmo Vänskä.

Recognition
In 2017, Kuusisto was awarded the  medal of the Order of the Lion of Finland.

Personal life
Jaakko Kuusisto came from a musical family: his father was opera composer Ilkka Kuusisto, his brother musician Pekka Kuusisto, and his grandfather composer and choirmaster Taneli Kuusisto.

Outside music, Kuusisto was also active in the wider society and politics, and in 2021 became elected member of Oulu city council, representing the Green League.

Kuusisto died from brain cancer on 23 February 2022, at the age of 48. He had been diagnosed and operated on in 2020, and announced on social media to encourage others to seek medical advice "even for mild symptoms", which in his case included headaches and problems with speech.

References

External links

 
 

1974 births
2022 deaths
Finnish composers
Finnish conductors (music)
Finnish violinists
Musicians from Helsinki
Deaths from brain cancer in Finland
Pro Finlandia Medals of the Order of the Lion of Finland